Charles Patrick Gillen (August 6, 1876 – June 30, 1956) was the Democratic mayor of Newark, New Jersey from 1917 to 1921. He was the first mayor under the reincorporation as a City Commission form of government.

Biography
He was born in County Roscommon, Ireland on August 6, 1876. He was the son of Thomas Gillen and Mary A. Conry. He was Irish Catholic.

He married Margaret Carey in 1923. He had a real estate business before entering politics. He was the mayor of Newark, New Jersey from 1917 to 1921. He was a delegate to the 1932 Democratic National Convention.

He died on June 30, 1956 at Saint Michael's Medical Center in Newark, New Jersey, aged 79 and was buried at Mount Olivet Cemetery, Newark.

See also
List of mayors of Newark, New Jersey

External links
Charles P. Gillen at The Political Graveyard

References

1876 births
1956 deaths
New Jersey Democrats
Mayors of Newark, New Jersey
Politicians from County Roscommon
Irish emigrants to the United States (before 1923)